The Equatoguinean Cup (Spanish: Copa de Su Excelencia) is the top knockout tournament of the Equatoguinean football. Its full name is Equatoguinean Cup - King's Cup  Abudunal Sun. It was created in 1974.

Winners
1978 : Union (Mongomo)
1979 : Akonangui FC
1980 : CD Elá Nguema
1981 : CD Elá Nguema
1982 : CD Elá Nguema
1983 : CD Elá Nguema
1984 : GD Lage (Malabo)
1985 : Atlético Malabo
1986 : Junevil Reyes (Bata)
1987 : Atlético Malabo
1988 : Atlético Malabo
1989 : Union Vesper (Bata)
1990 : Atlético Malabo
1991 : Atlético Malabo
1992 : CD Elá Nguema
unknown winner between 1993 and 1995
1996 : Akonangui FC
1997 : CD Elá Nguema 1-0 Deportivo Mongomo
1998 : Union Vesper
1999 : CD Unidad Malabo
2000 : CD Unidad Malabo
2001 : Atlético Malabo
2002 : Akonangui FC bt Sony Elá Nguema
2003 :  unknown
2004 : Sony de Elá Nguema 1-0 Akonangui FC
unknown winner between 2005 and 2006
2007 : Akonangui 2-0 Atlético Malabo
2009 : Dragón
2011 : Atlético Semu 2-1 Águilas Verdes
2012 : The Panthers 1-0 AD Mesi Nkulu
2013 : The Panthers 2-0 Nsok-Nsomo
2014 : Leones Vegetarianos 1-1 Deportivo Mongomo [5-4 pen]
2015 : Deportivo Mongomo 2-0 The Panthers
2016 : Racing de Micomeseng 1-1 Atlético Semu [6-5 pen]
2017 : Deportivo Niefang 1-0 Atlético Semu
2018 : not played
2019 : Akonangui 2-0 Estrella Roja

References

Football competitions in Equatorial Guinea
National association football cups